Epigynum is a genus of plant in the family Apocynaceae. It has 5 known species.

Species 
 Epigynum auritum
 Epigynum cochinchinensis
 Epigynum graciliflorum
 Epigynum griffithianum
 Epigynum ridleyi

References

External links 

Apocynaceae genera
Apocyneae